Horton is a civil parish in Ribble Valley, Lancashire, England. It contains 14 listed buildings that are recorded in the National Heritage List for England. Of these, one is at Grade II*, the middle grade, and the others are at Grade II, the lowest grade. The parish contains the village of Horton, surrounding countryside, and part of the grounds of Gisburne Park. Most of the listed buildings are houses and associated structures, farmhouses and farm buildings. The other listed buildings include a bridge, a chapel, a boundary stone, and a milestone.

Key

Buildings

References

Citations

Sources

Lists of listed buildings in Lancashire
Buildings and structures in Ribble Valley